Neetu is a given name. Notable people with the name include:

Neetu Chandra (born 1984), Indian film actress, model, and martial artist
Neetu David (born 1977), Indian cricketer
Neetu Singh (born 1958), Indian actress
Neetu Singh (born 1990), Indian actress and model

Indian feminine given names